Aval Yaar is a 1959 Indian Tamil-language legal thriller film, directed by K. J. Mahadevan. The film stars Sivaji Ganesan, Pandari Bai, S. V. Ranga Rao and Sowcar Janaki. It was released on 30 October 1959, and did not do well at the box office.

Plot 

Mahalakshmi is the daughter of a wealthy banker Sahasranamam, who wishes that she would marry a young man (Gopi). However, a noted lawyer of that town, Sadhasivam, a widower, wishes to marry her and to save her father's reputation, she marries him and soon loses her father. The couple have a son. The lawyer's nephew Bhoopathi, not worldly-wise, has a friend Bahadur, who wishes to exploit him for his money. Bhoopathi has a sweetheart Asha. Thanks to the marriage, the lawyer's safe keys are now handled by Mahalakshmi, which upsets Bahadur. He drives a wedge between the lawyer and his wife. Suspecting his wife, the lawyer turns her out of the house. The innocent woman without her husband's knowledge takes the child away. She loses the child, who is brought up by a rich couple Manivel and Maragatham. This upsets Mahalakshmi, who loses her mental balance.

Years pass and Mahalakshmi, completely cured, takes care of a young girl Vijaya under a new name, Ponni. Her son goes to England to become a barrister, about which his mother has no knowledge. Bahadur creates fake letters as if written by Mahalakshmi and threatens to publish them in his third-rate "yellow" magazine unless she pays a huge price. When she goes to meet Bahadur to persuade him to hand over the letters, he is found murdered. She is arrested and charged with murder. By now Sadhasivam has become a judge and the case comes up for trial before him. How the truth comes out and happiness is restored forms the rest of the plot.

Cast 

Male cast
 Sivaji Ganesan as Sadhasivam
 Ramanachalam as Kannan
 S. V. Ranga Rao as Manivel
 S. V. Sahasranamam as Banker Sahasranamam
 T. R. Ramachandran as Boopathy
 T. K. Ramachandran as Bahadur
 G. Pattu Iyer as Doctor
 V. Gopalakrishnan as Ragupathy
 Parthiban as Ravichandran
 G. V. Sharma as Sundaramoorthy

Female cast
 Pandari Bai as Mahalakshmi
 Sowcar Janaki as Vijaya
 Malini as Asha
 Sandhya as Maragatham
 K. R. Chellam as Ponnamma
 Baby Malathi as Baby Vijaya
 Karaikudi Lakshmi as Vijaya's Mother
Support cast
 Ganapathy Bhat, Sami Velayutham, Sampath,V. K. Achari, and Haniff Kumar.

Soundtrack 
The music was composed by S. Rajeswara Rao while the lyrics were penned by Papanasam Sivan, V. Seetharaman, Pattukkottai Kalyanasundaram, and V. Lakshmanan. One song "Kannan Pirandhaan" by Subramania Bharati also was included in the film.

Reception 
Ananda Vikatan said that though the story was confusing, the film was technically good. Kanthan of Kalki appreciated the director for trying to take Tamil cinema in a new direction, even if he was not successful in achieving that goal.

References

External links 
 

1950s Tamil-language films
1959 films
Films scored by S. Rajeswara Rao
Legal thriller films